Wendy Suzanne Bruce-Martin is a retired gymnast from the United States. She was a member of the U.S. Women's Gymnastics Team at the 1989 World Championships in Stuttgart, Germany,  and the 1992 Summer Olympic Games in Barcelona, Spain.

At the 1989 World Championships, she placed eleventh in the individual all-around, and the U.S. women's team finished fourth.

At the 1992 Olympics, the U.S. women's team won a bronze medal, which was the first U.S. team medal won at a fully attended Olympic Games.

Wendy is married with two children and is the owner of Get Psyched! Mental Coaching.

References

External links
Wendy Bruce-Martin official website
Whatever happened to Wendy Bruce?

American female artistic gymnasts
Lake Brantley High School alumni
Gymnasts at the 1992 Summer Olympics
Living people
Medalists at the 1992 Summer Olympics
Olympic bronze medalists for the United States in gymnastics
U.S. women's national team gymnasts
1973 births
Gymnasts from Texas
20th-century American women